The 2006 season was D.C. United's eleventh season of soccer, its eleventh consecutive season in Major League Soccer, the top tier of American soccer. The club also played in the U.S. Open Cup, the United States' domestic knockout cup competition. The reserve team played for their second season in the MLS Reserve League.

D.C. United earned their third ever Supporters' Shield, and their first since 1999 by defeating their longtime rivals, the New York Red Bulls 4–3 on September 23. The Shield, which is given to the MLS club with the best regular season record, was United's third ever shield, becoming the first MLS franchise achieve three or more Supporters' Shields, a feat that would not be achieve by a different top division team until 2009. By finishing first in the Eastern Conference, United earned a top seed in the MLS Cup Playoffs, where they won a two-match aggregate series against the Red Bulls, 2–1. United's postseason ended in the Eastern Conference Final on November 5, when they were defeated 1–0 by the New England Revolution.

In the U.S. Open Cup, United reached the semifinal proper of the competition, their best run in the tournament since 2003. United opened their first two rounds of the competition against MLS opposition posting an extra time victory over Columbus Crew, and a 3–1 victory over the Red Bulls in the quarterfinal proper. United was ultimately defeated by a resounding 3–0 scoreline against eventual Open Cup champions, Chicago Fire on September 1.

Background 

D.C. United came off a 2005 campaign that saw the club improve in league play, but fail to defend the MLS Cup championship in postseason playing, bowing out in the conference playoff semifinals. In league play, United saw an uptick in their performance, accumulating the third best regular season record in the entire league, and the second strongest record in the Eastern Conference.

Beyond Major League Soccer, United participated in both the CONCACAF Champions' Cup (now known as the Champions League) and the U.S. Open Cup, in which United were eliminated in the semifinal and quarterfinal rounds, respectively. United was eliminated from the Champions' Cup on April 13, 2005 by Mexican club, UNAM Pumas, while they were eliminated in the Open Cup by FC Dallas through a penalty shootout on August 24, 2005.

Review

October and November 

In the Conference Final, United lost 1–0 to New England off a fourth-minute goal from Taylor Twellman.

Non-competitive

Preseason exhibitions

Carolina Challenge Cup

Midseason friendlies

Competitive

Major League Soccer

Standings

Conference

Overall

Results summary

Results by round

Game reports

MLS Cup Playoffs

U.S. Open Cup

Statistics

Appearances and goals 

|}

Top scorers 

{| class="wikitable" style="font-size: 95%; text-align: center;"
|-
!width=60|Rank
!width=60|Nation
!width=60|Number
!width=150|Name
!width=80|Total
!width=80|MLS
!width=80|Open Cup
!width=80|MLS Cup
|-
|1
|
|10
|Christian Gómez
|16
|14
|0
|2
|-
|2
|
|99
|Jaime Moreno
|12
|11
|1
|0
|-
|3
|
|11
|Alecko Eskandarian
|7
|4
|0
|0
|-
|4
|
|4
|Joshua Gros
|4
|3
|1
|0
|-
|4
|
|17
|Jamil Walker
|4
|1
|3
|0
|-
|6
|
|5
|Facundo Erpen
|3
|3
|0
|0
|-
|7
|
|9
|Freddy Adu
|2
|2
|0
|0
|-
|7
|
|14
|Ben Olsen
|2
|2
|0
|0
|-

Transfers

In
Sourced list of players signed during the season

Out
Sourced list of players sold or loaned out during the season

See also
2006 in American soccer
2006 Major League Soccer
List of D.C. United seasons

References
Footnotes
A : One-legged match.
Citations

Further Information
The Year in American Soccer, 2006 – The American Soccer Archives 
2006 Archived Schedule

2006
Dc United
Dc United
2006 in sports in Washington, D.C.
2006